Narimogru  is a village in the southern state of Karnataka, India. It is located in the Puttur taluk of Dakshina Kannada district in Karnataka.

Demographics
 India census, Narimogru had a population of 6067 with 3012 males and 3055 females.

See also
 Mangalore
 Dakshina Kannada
 Districts of Karnataka

References

External links
 http://dk.nic.in/

Villages in Dakshina Kannada district